The 2014 United States House of Representatives elections in New Mexico were held on Tuesday, November 4, 2014 to elect the three U.S. representatives from the state of New Mexico, one from each of the state's three congressional districts. The elections coincided with the elections of other federal and state offices, including the Governor of New Mexico and a United States Senator.

Overview
Results of the 2014 United States House of Representatives elections in New Mexico by district:

District 1

The 1st district includes the central area of New Mexico, including almost three-fourths of Albuquerque. The incumbent is Democrat Michelle Lujan Grisham, who has represented the district since 2013. She was elected with 59% of the vote in 2012, succeeding retiring Democratic incumbent Martin Heinrich. The district has a PVI of D+7.

Republicans Michael Frese and Richard Priem are also running.

Primary results

General election

District 2

The 2nd district includes the southern half of New Mexico, including Las Cruces, Roswell and the southern fourth of Albuquerque. Geographically, it is the sixth largest district in the nation and the 2nd-largest not to comprise an entire state (after Nevada's 2nd district). Incumbent Steve Pearce was unopposed in the Republican primary, while Roxanne "Rocky" Lara was unopposed in the Democratic primary.

Primary results

General election

District 3

The 3rd district the northern half of New Mexico, including the state's Capital, Santa Fe. The incumbent is Democrat Ben R. Luján, who has represented the district since 2009. He was re-elected with 63% of the vote in 2012 and the district has a PVI of D+8.

Albuquerque Assistant District Attorney Robert Blanch ran against Luján in the Democratic primary.

Republican Jeff Byrd is the only other candidate for the seat.

Primary results

General election

See also
 2014 United States House of Representatives elections
 2014 United States elections

References

External links
U.S. House elections in New Mexico, 2014 at Ballotpedia
Campaign contributions at OpenSecrets

New Mexico
2014
United States House of Representatives